Nancy Adams (1926–2007) was a New Zealand botanist.

Nancy Adams may also refer to:

Nancy Adams Collins (born 1947), née Nancy Adams, of the Mississippi State Senate
Nancy Adams (singer), singer of the 1973 Disney song, "Love"

Fictional characters
Nancy Adams (Ace of Aces), character in Ace of Aces
Nancy Adams (Smallville), character in Smallville

See also
Nancy Adam (1888–1982), Scottish trade union officer